The A688 is a road in County Durham in North East England.

Route
The road passes through the village of Staindrop, past Raby Castle through West Auckland, Bishop Auckland and on to Spennymoor. It then continues through the Thinford intersection with the A167 to Junction 61 of the A1(M) at Bowburn. The latest extension, which was from the A1(M) Junction 61 to the A181, was opened on 30 October 2008.

Description
The road is single-carriageway except for a short  stretch of dual-carriageway at Spennymoor.

References

External links

Roads in England
Transport in County Durham